is a Japanese anime director and animator. After joining an animation school at the request of a friend, Hayashi began working in the anime industry with Inuyasha in 2001 and later got his first role as director in 2012. Some series he has directed include Garo: The Animation, Kakegurui, Dorohedoro, and Attack on Titan: The Final Season.

Biography
After graduating from high school, Hayashi did not have any specific career in mind to pursue. However, he was convinced by a friend to join an animation school run by Toei Animation. He later worked on his first series with in-between and key animation for Inuyasha in 2001. In 2012, he directed his first series with Pes: Peace Eco Smile, a series of anime shorts produced by Studio 4°C to promote Toyota. He was later offered by Masao Maruyama to direct Garo: The Animation at MAPPA, which he accepted.

Shortly after completing work on Garo: The Animation, Hayashi was approached by MAPPA CEO Manabu Otsuka, to direct Kakegurui, to which Hayashi agreed. Hayashi later directed Dorohedoro, which was nominated for anime of the year and best fantasy at the 2021 Crunchyroll Anime Awards. Beginning in 2020, Hayashi directed Attack on Titan: The Final Season, which was nominated for anime of the year and best action at the 2022 Crunchyroll Anime Awards. Hayashi himself was also nominated for best director.

Works

TV series
 Inuyasha (2001) (in-between and key animation)
 Sōten Kōro (2009) (character designer)
 Garo: The Animation (2014–2015) (director)
 Kakegurui (2017–2019) (director)
 Dorohedoro (2020) (director)
 Attack on Titan: The Final Season (2020–present) (director)

Films
 Batman: Gotham Knight (2008) (key animation)
 Halo Legends (2009) (mechanical designs)
 Welcome to the Space Show (2010) (art director)
 009 Re:Cyborg (2012) (storyboards)
 Psycho-Pass: The Movie (2015) (storyboards)
 Garo: Divine Flame (2016) (director)

Web series
 Pes: Peace Eco Smile (2012) (director)
 Kakegurui Twin (2022) (chief director)

References

External links
 

Anime directors
Japanese animators
Japanese film directors
Japanese storyboard artists
Japanese television directors
Living people
Year of birth missing (living people)